Alfred Teppan (17 December 1890 Kuremaa Parish, Tartu County – 29 November 1975 Kohtla-Järve) was an Estonian dramatist and politician. He was a member of I Riigikogu. He was a member of the Riigikogu since 14 March 1922. He replaced Jaan Järve.

References

1890 births
1975 deaths
Members of the Riigikogu, 1920–1923